Mahmut Oltan Sungurlu (or alternatively written as Oltan Sungurlu; born 1936, Gümüşhane), is a former Turkish politician. He served as the Minister of National Defense between March 1996 and June 1996.

Early life 
Sungurlu was born in 1936 in the Gümüşhane district in Gümüşhane Province, eastern Turkey. Sungurlu continued his secondary education in Bursa High School. He was educated in law at the Istanbul University.

Professional career 
After university, Oltan Sungurlu started to work as a lawyer in 1963. He established the Gümüşhane Motherland Party provincial organization in 1983 and was elected as a deputy of Gümüşhane. He served in the Court of Accounts and National Defense Budget Commissions in the Parliament. He became the Minister of Justice in October 1986. He was elected four times as a deputy of Gümüşhane in 1983, 1987, 1991 and 1995.

He served as the chairman of the Board of Trustees of Istanbul Şehir University, founded by the Science and Arts Foundation (BİSAV). He is married and has one child.

At the same time, he is the president of the SÜGAV Foundation.

References

Istanbul University Faculty of Law alumni
Ministers of Justice of Turkey
Ministers of National Defence of Turkey
1936 births
Living people